2015 GoDaddy Bowl can refer to:

 2015 GoDaddy Bowl (January), played as part of the 2014–15 college football bowl season between the Arkansas State Red Wolves and the Toledo Rockets
 2015 GoDaddy Bowl (December), played as part of the 2015–16 college football bowl season between the Bowling Green Falcons and the Georgia Southern Eagles